Sarah Rosen Wartell is a public policy executive and housing markets expert who serves as president of the Urban Institute, a nonpartisan social and economic policy research institute in Washington D.C. She previously worked in the Federal Housing Administration and National Economic Council, and co-founded the Center for American Progress.

Early career
Wartell practiced law with the Washington, D.C., firm of Arnold & Porter, was a visiting scholar and adjunct professor at Georgetown University Law Center, and was a consultant to the bipartisan Millennial Housing Commission.

Career in government

Federal Housing Administration
From 1993 to 1998, Wartell was a Deputy Assistant Secretary at the Federal Housing Administration in the Department of Housing and Urban Development, advising the federal housing commissioner on housing finance, mortgage markets, and consumer protection.

Clinton administration
Wartell was President Bill Clinton's deputy assistant for economic policy and the deputy director of his National Economic Council. In the White House from 1998 to 2000, she led over a dozen interagency working groups, negotiated legislation, and managed administration policymaking in housing and community development, financial markets and banking, insurance, consumer protection, pensions, tort reform, and other areas.

Later career

Center for American Progress
Wartell co-founded the Center for American Progress (CAP), a progressive public policy and research organization.  She served as its first chief operating officer and general counsel and later, as executive vice president. Her work focused on the economy and housing markets, and she directed the Mortgage Finance Working Group and "Doing What Works" government performance program.

Urban Institute
In February 2012, Wartell became the third president of the Urban Institute, succeeding former president Robert D. Reischauer. The Urban Institute is an economic and social science research and policy organization whose more than 450 researchers, experts, and other staff believe in the power of evidence to improve lives and strengthen communities. During her tenure, Urban has articulated its strategy to “elevate the debate” by bringing more of its insights from research to federal, state, and local government and practice; becoming a leader in research communications and data visualization; and undertaking an ambitious program of business systems and technology modernization.

References

External links
 

Center for American Progress people
living people
United States Department of Housing and Urban Development officials
Urban Institute people
year of birth missing (living people)
Arnold & Porter people